Clinura is a genus of sea snails, marine gastropod mollusks in the family Raphitomidae.

This genus was only known from fossils from the Cenozoic era until 1997 when Sysoev found a specimen of Clinura vitrea off the Taninbar Islands, Indonesia.

Species
Species within the genus Clinura include:
 † Clinura calliope Brocchi, G.B., 1814
 † Clinura circumfossa (Koenen, 1872) 
 † Clinura controversa Jan
 † Clinura generosa (Marwick, 1931) 
 † Clinura sabatorium Bellardi, 1875 
 † Clinura sopronensis Hoernes & Auinger, 1879 
 † Clinura subtrochlearis Friedberg, 1912 
 † Clinura trochlearis Hoernes, 1856
 Clinura vitrea Sysoev, 1997
Species brought into synonymy
 † Clinura elegantissima (Foresti, 1868): synonym of Teretia elegantissima (Forresti, 1868)
 Clinura hosoi (Okutani, 1964): synonym of Crassispira hosoi (Okutani, 1964)
 Clinura monochorda Dall, 1908: synonym of Anticlinura monochorda (Dall, 1908) (original combination)
 Clinura peruviana Dall, 1908: synonym of Anticlinura peruviana (Dall, 1908) (original combination)

References

External links
 Beets, C., 1942b. Notizen über Thatcheria Angas, Clinura Bellardi und Clinuropsis Vincent. Leidsche Geol. Meded., vol. 13, pp. 356-367
 A.J. Charig, The Gastropod Genus Thatcheria and its Relationships; Bulletin of the British Museum (Natural History), vol.  7 # 9 (1963)
  Bouchet P., Kantor Yu.I., Sysoev A. & Puillandre N. (2011) A new operational classification of the Conoidea. Journal of Molluscan Studies 77: 273-308
 
 Worldwide Mollusc Species Data Base: Raphitomidae

 
Raphitomidae
Gastropod genera